This is a list of public art in Conwy County Borough, Wales. Conwy County Borough (Welsh: Bwrdeistref Sirol Conwy) is a unitary authority area in North Wales and includes the town of Conwy. This list applies only to works of public art on permanent display in an outdoor public space and does not, for example, include artworks in museums.

Abergele

Capel Curig

Capel Garmon

Colwyn Bay

Conwy

Dolgarrog

Dolwyddelan

Llandudno

Llansannan

Llyn Crafnant

Penmaenmawr

References

Conwy
Conwy